Basil Bark (born July 21, 1945) is a former professional Canadian football offensive lineman who played 13 seasons in the Canadian Football League for two different teams. He is a part of the Calgary Stampeders 1971 Grey Cup

References

1945 births
Living people
Calgary Stampeders players
Canadian football offensive linemen
Montreal Alouettes players
Players of Canadian football from Quebec
Canadian football people from Montreal